1856 Růžena, provisional designation , is a stony asteroid from the inner regions of the asteroid belt, approximately 6.6 kilometers in diameter. It was discovered on 8 October 1969, by Russian astronomer Lyudmila Chernykh at Crimean Astrophysical Observatory in Nauchny, on the Crimean peninsula. The asteroid was named after Růžena Petrovicova, staff member at Kleť Observatory.

Orbit and classification 

Růžena orbits the Sun in the inner main-belt at a distance of 2.1–2.4 AU once every 3 years and 4 months (1,222 days). Its orbit has an eccentricity of 0.08 and an inclination of 5° with respect to the ecliptic. The body's observation arc, however, starts with its official discovery observation at Nauchnyj in 1969.

Physical characteristics 

Růžena is bright S-type asteroid in the SMASS classification.

According to the survey carried out by NASA's Wide-field Infrared Survey Explorer with its subsequent NEOWISE mission, Růžena measures 6.62 kilometers in diameter and its surface has an albedo of 0.335. As of 2016, the body's rotation period and shape remain unknown.

Naming 

This asteroid was named in honor of Růžena Petrovicova, observer of comets and minor planets and staff member of the Kleť Observatory, located in what is now the Czech Republic. The official  was published by the Minor Planet Center on 1 June 1975.

References

External links 
 Asteroid Lightcurve Database (LCDB), query form (info )
 Dictionary of Minor Planet Names, Google books
 Asteroids and comets rotation curves, CdR – Observatoire de Genève, Raoul Behrend
 Discovery Circumstances: Numbered Minor Planets (1)-(5000) – Minor Planet Center
 
 

001856
Discoveries by Lyudmila Chernykh
Named minor planets
001856
19691008